The Downing-Detroit was a cyclecar manufactured in Detroit, Michigan, by the Downing Motor Company from 1913 to 1915.  The Downing was offered as two models. The first was a two-passenger air-cooled V-twin engine of 13 hp. The second model was a light car, with a water-cooled four-cylinder engine and a three-speed transmission.

See also
Brass Era car

References
 

Defunct motor vehicle manufacturers of the United States
Motor vehicle manufacturers based in Michigan
Cyclecars
Defunct companies based in Michigan